Solfrid "Winnie" Heier (born September 20, 1945) is a Norwegian actress and singer. She has appeared in film and television roles.

Heier has appeared in the films Skjær i sjøen, Balladen om mestertyven Ole Høiland, Olsenbanden – Operasjon Egon, Krigerens hjerte, and Ute av drift! She made her stage debut at age 17 in Peder Wright Cappelen's play Dikter i ulvepels at the Oslo new Theater, and since then she has also played at the National Traveling Theater, Trøndelag Theater, Chateau Neuf, and Stockholm City Theatre, and she has also had guest roles in TV series such as Karl & Co, Hotel Cæsar, and Mot i brøstet.

She made her recording debut in the mid-1960s under the artist's name Winnie. In 1967 she won third place in the Norwegian Melodi Grand Prix together with Toril Støa with the song "Skitur." Heier was also a recording artist in Sweden.

In 2007, she was the only actress in the play The Alchemist (Norwegian title: Alkymisten), based on the novel by Paulo Coelho, among other plays at the Christiania Theater.

Filmography

 1965: Skjær i sjøen as Lone
 1968: Sus og dus på by'n as Olga  
 1969: Olsen-Banden as Ulla, Benny's fiancée
 1969: Brent jord as Herdis
 1970: Balladen om mestertyven Ole Høiland as the Gypsy girl
 1974: Under en steinhimmel as Martha
 1992: Krigerens hjerte as Mrs. Simmonaes
 1994: Ute av drift! as Jorunn Verde
 2005: Olsenbanden jr. på Cirkus as Mrs. Flamingo

Discography
1965: "Tänk om han säger nej" / "Usla karl" (Karusell KFF 625)

References

External links
 
 Solfrid Heier at the Swedish Film Database
 Solfrid Heier at Sceneweb
 Solfrid Heier at Filmfront

Living people
1945 births

20th-century Norwegian actresses
21st-century Norwegian actresses
Norwegian women singers
Melodi Grand Prix contestants